Harold Foster Hallet (1886 – 1966), was a British Philosopher

From 1904 to 1908 - shipyard of Messrs Young and Co at Poplar.

1908 - BSc in Engineering from the University of London.

In 1912 he gained an MA in Mental Philosophy from the University of Edinburgh.

In 1912–1916 - Lecturer in Logic, and Assistant in Logic and Metaphysics.

In 1915–1916 - Assistant in Moral Philosophy.

In 1919–1922 - Assistant Lecturer at the University of Leeds.

In 1922–1931 - Lecturer in Philosophy at the University of Leeds.

From 1931 to 1951 - Professor of Philosophy at King's College London.

In 1929–1935 Hallett - British Secretary of the Societas Spinoza.

In 1935–1945 - Chairman of the Board of Philosophical Studies at the University of London.

He is the author of numerous books and articles on philosophy; most noteworthy is his seminal work in the philosophy of Baruch Spinoza. His "Spinoza The Elements of His Philosophy" stands as the most comprehensive and erudite analysis of Spinoza's system in the entire extant.

The book employs an extremely sophisticated philosophical language, much which appears to be usages uniquely employed to capture in intricate detail all of the interrelationships or 'potency in act' among Substance, Attribute and the Modalities. This detail allows Hallett to display the complete unity and self-evident truth value in the "Ethics" and related Spinoza writings.
Spinoza's tersely stated propositions, corollaries, demonstrations, definitions and scholia, along with the dearth of illustrations or examples have left many of those lacking in imaginative or expansionary thinking to surmise and explicate much useless commentary. Professor Hallett sets this sorry situation to rights. His work is written for trained students of philosophy, but the intelligent and capable non-philosopher can glean new learnings through diligent study and deep reflection on elegance of Hallett's wisdom and tutelage.
Charles M. Saunders

References

British philosophers
Alumni of the University of Edinburgh
Academics of the University of Leeds
Academics of King's College London